The International Phonetic Alphabet (IPA) is an alphabetic system of phonetic notation based primarily on the Latin script. It was devised by the International Phonetic Association in the late 19th century as a standardized representation of speech sounds in written form. The IPA is used by lexicographers, foreign language students and teachers, linguists, speech–language pathologists, singers, actors, constructed language creators, and translators.

The IPA is designed to represent those qualities of speech that are part of lexical (and, to a limited extent, prosodic) sounds in oral language: phones, phonemes, intonation, and the separation of words and syllables. To represent additional qualities of speech—such as tooth gnashing, lisping, and sounds made with a cleft lip and cleft palate—an extended set of symbols may be used.

Segments are transcribed by one or more IPA symbols of two basic types: letters and diacritics. For example, the sound of the English letter  may be transcribed in IPA with a single letter: , or with a letter plus diacritics: , depending on how precise one wishes to be.

Occasionally, letters or diacritics are added, removed, or modified by the International Phonetic Association. As of the most recent change in 2005, there are 107 segmental letters, an indefinitely large number of suprasegmental letters, 44 diacritics (not counting composites), and four extra-lexical prosodic marks in the IPA. Most of these are shown in the current IPA chart, posted below in this article and at the website of the IPA.

History

In 1886, a group of French and British language teachers, led by the French linguist Paul Passy, formed what would be known from 1897 onwards as the International Phonetic Association (in French). Their original alphabet was based on a spelling reform for English known as the Romic alphabet, but to make it usable for other languages the values of the symbols were allowed to vary from language to language. For example, the sound  (the sh in shoe) was originally represented with the letter  in English, but with the digraph  in French. In 1888, the alphabet was revised to be uniform across languages, thus providing the base for all future revisions. The idea of making the IPA was first suggested by Otto Jespersen in a letter to Passy. It was developed by Alexander John Ellis, Henry Sweet, Daniel Jones, and Passy.

Since its creation, the IPA has undergone a number of revisions. After revisions and expansions from the 1890s to the 1940s, the IPA remained primarily unchanged until the Kiel Convention in 1989. A minor revision took place in 1993 with the addition of four letters for mid central vowels and the removal of letters for voiceless implosives. The alphabet was last revised in May 2005 with the addition of a letter for a labiodental flap. Apart from the addition and removal of symbols, changes to the IPA have consisted largely of renaming symbols and categories and in modifying typefaces.

Extensions to the International Phonetic Alphabet for speech pathology (extIPA) were created in 1990 and were officially adopted by the International Clinical Phonetics and Linguistics Association in 1994.

Description
The general principle of the IPA is to provide one letter for each distinctive sound (speech segment). This means that:
 The IPA does not usually have separate letters for two sounds if no known language makes a distinction between them, a property known as "selectiveness". However, if a large number of phonemically distinct letters can be derived with a diacritic, that may be used instead.

The alphabet is designed for transcribing sounds (phones), not phonemes, though it is used for phonemic transcription as well. When the IPA is used for phonemic transcription, the letter–sound correspondence can be rather loose.

Among the symbols of the IPA, 107 letters represent consonants and vowels, 31 diacritics are used to modify these, and 17 additional signs indicate suprasegmental qualities such as length, tone, stress, and intonation. These are organized into a chart; the chart displayed here is the official chart as posted at the website of the IPA.

Letter forms

The letters chosen for the IPA are meant to harmonize with the Latin alphabet. For this reason, most letters are either Latin or Greek, or modifications thereof. Some letters are neither: for example, the letter denoting the glottal stop, originally had the form of a dotless question mark, and derives from an apostrophe. A few letters, such as that of the voiced pharyngeal fricative, were inspired by other writing systems (in this case, the Arabic letter ⟨⟩, via the reversed apostrophe).

Some letter forms derive from existing letters: 
It originates from the hook of an r.
Either the original letter may be reminiscent of the target sound (e.g.) or the turned one (e.g.).

 Among consonant letters, the small capital letters , and also  in extIPA, indicate more guttural sounds than their base letters. ( is a late exception.) Among vowel letters, small capitals indicate "lax" vowels. Most of the original small-cap vowel letters have been modified into more distinctive shapes (e.g.  from ), with only  remaining as small capitals.

Typography and iconicity
The International Phonetic Alphabet is based on the Latin script, and uses as few non-Latin letters as possible. The Association created the IPA so that the sound values of most letters would correspond to "international usage" (approximately Classical Latin).

This basic Latin inventory was extended by adding small-capital and cursive forms, diacritics and rotation. The sound values of these letters are related to those of the original letters, and their derivation may be iconic. For example, letters with a rightward-facing hook at the bottom represent retroflex equivalents of the source letters, and small capital letters usually represent uvular equivalents of their source letters. 

There are also several letters from the Greek alphabet, though their sound values may differ from Greek.
The tone letters are not derived from an alphabet, but from a pitch trace on a musical scale. 

Beyond the letters themselves, there are a variety of secondary symbols which aid in transcription. Diacritic marks can be combined with IPA letters to add phonetic detail such as tone and secondary articulations. There are also special symbols for prosodic features such as stress and intonation.

Brackets and transcription delimiters

There are two principal types of brackets used to set off (delimit) IPA transcriptions:

Other conventions are less commonly seen:

All three of the above are provided by the IPA Handbook. The following are not, but may be seen in IPA transcription or in associated material (especially angle brackets):

Some examples of contrasting brackets in the literature:

Other representations

IPA letters have cursive forms designed for use in manuscripts and when taking field notes, but the 1999 Handbook of the International Phonetic Association recommended against their use, as cursive IPA is "harder for most people to decipher." A braille representation of the IPA for blind or visually impaired professionals and students has also been developed.

Modifying the IPA chart

The International Phonetic Alphabet is occasionally modified by the Association. After each modification, the Association provides an updated simplified presentation of the alphabet in the form of a chart. (See History of the IPA.) Not all aspects of the alphabet can be accommodated in a chart of the size published by the IPA. The alveolo-palatal and epiglottal consonants, for example, are not included in the consonant chart for reasons of space rather than of theory (two additional columns would be required, one between the retroflex and palatal columns and the other between the pharyngeal and glottal columns), and the lateral flap would require an additional row for that single consonant, so they are listed instead under the catchall block of "other symbols". The indefinitely large number of tone letters would make a full accounting impractical even on a larger page, and only a few examples are shown, and even the tone diacritics are not complete; the reversed tone letters are not illustrated at all.

The procedure for modifying the alphabet or the chart is to propose the change in the Journal of the IPA. (See, for example, August 2008 on an open central unrounded vowel and August 2011 on central approximants.) Reactions to the proposal may be published in the same or subsequent issues of the Journal (as in August 2009 on the open central vowel). A formal proposal is then put to the Council of the IPA – which is elected by the membership – for further discussion and a formal vote.

Nonetheless, many users of the alphabet, including the leadership of the Association itself, deviate from this norm.
The Journal of the IPA finds it acceptable to mix IPA and extIPA symbols in consonant charts in their articles.

Usage

Of more than 160 IPA symbols, relatively few will be used to transcribe speech in any one language, with various levels of precision. A precise phonetic transcription, in which sounds are specified in detail, is known as a narrow transcription. A coarser transcription with less detail is called a broad transcription. Both are relative terms, and both are generally enclosed in square brackets. Broad phonetic transcriptions may restrict themselves to easily heard details, or only to details that are relevant to the discussion at hand, and may differ little if at all from phonemic transcriptions, but they make no theoretical claim that all the distinctions transcribed are necessarily meaningful in the language.

Phonemic transcriptions, which express the conceptual counterparts of spoken sounds, are usually enclosed in slashes (/ /) and tend to use simpler letters with few diacritics. The choice of IPA letters may reflect theoretical claims of how speakers conceptualize sounds as phonemes or they may be merely a convenience for typesetting. Phonemic approximations between slashes do not have absolute sound values.

Linguists
IPA is popular for transcription by linguists. Some American linguists, however, use a mix of IPA with Americanist phonetic notation or use some nonstandard symbols for various reasons. Authors who employ such nonstandard use are encouraged to include a chart or other explanation of their choices, which is good practice in general, as linguists differ in their understanding of the exact meaning of IPA symbols and common conventions change over time.

Dictionaries

English
Many British dictionaries, including the Oxford English Dictionary and some learner's dictionaries such as the Oxford Advanced Learner's Dictionary and the Cambridge Advanced Learner's Dictionary, now use the International Phonetic Alphabet to represent the pronunciation of words. However, most American (and some British) volumes use one of a variety of pronunciation respelling systems, intended to be more comfortable for readers of English and to be more acceptable across dialects, without the implication of a preferred pronunciation that the IPA might convey.

Other languages
The IPA is also not universal among dictionaries in languages other than English. Monolingual dictionaries of languages with phonemic orthographies generally do not bother with indicating the pronunciation of most words, and tend to use respelling systems for words with unexpected pronunciations. Dictionaries produced in Israel use the IPA rarely and sometimes use the Hebrew alphabet for transcription of foreign words. Bilingual dictionaries that translate from foreign languages into Russian usually employ the IPA, but monolingual Russian dictionaries occasionally use pronunciation respelling for foreign words. The IPA is more common in bilingual dictionaries, but there are exceptions here too. Mass-market bilingual Czech dictionaries, for instance, tend to use the IPA only for sounds not found in Czech.

Standard orthographies and case variants

IPA letters have been incorporated into the alphabets of various languages, notably via the Africa Alphabet in many sub-Saharan languages such as Hausa, Fula, Akan, Gbe languages, Manding languages, Lingala, etc. Capital case variants have been created for use in these languages. For example, Kabiyè of northern Togo has Ɖ ɖ, Ŋ ŋ, Ɣ ɣ, Ɔ ɔ, Ɛ ɛ, Ʋ ʋ. These, and others, are supported by Unicode, but appear in Latin ranges other than the IPA extensions.

In the IPA itself, however, only lower-case letters are used. The 1949 edition of the IPA handbook indicated that an asterisk  might be prefixed to indicate that a word was a proper name, but this convention was not included in the 1999 Handbook, which notes the contrary use of the asterisk as a placeholder for a sound or feature that does not have a symbol.

Classical singing
The IPA has widespread use among classical singers during preparation as they are frequently required to sing in a variety of foreign languages. They are also taught by vocal coaches to perfect diction and improve tone quality and tuning. Opera librettos are authoritatively transcribed in IPA, such as Nico Castel's volumes and Timothy Cheek's book Singing in Czech. Opera singers' ability to read IPA was used by the site Visual Thesaurus, which employed several opera singers "to make recordings for the 150,000 words and phrases in VT's lexical database ... for their vocal stamina, attention to the details of enunciation, and most of all, knowledge of IPA".

Letters

The International Phonetic Association organizes the letters of the IPA into three categories: pulmonic consonants, non-pulmonic consonants, and vowels.

Pulmonic consonant letters are arranged singly or in pairs of voiceless (tenuis) and voiced sounds, with these then grouped in columns from front (labial) sounds on the left to back (glottal) sounds on the right. In official publications by the IPA, two columns are omitted to save space, with the letters listed among 'other symbols' even though theoretically they belong in the main chart, and with the remaining consonants arranged in rows from full closure (occlusives: stops and nasals), to brief closure (vibrants: trills and taps), to partial closure (fricatives) and minimal closure (approximants), again with a row left out to save space. In the table below, a slightly different arrangement is made: All pulmonic consonants are included in the pulmonic-consonant table, and the vibrants and laterals are separated out so that the rows reflect the common lenition pathway of stop → fricative → approximant, as well as the fact that several letters pull double duty as both fricative and approximant; affricates may be created by joining stops and fricatives from adjacent cells. Shaded cells represent articulations that are judged to be impossible.

Vowel letters are also grouped in pairs—of unrounded and rounded vowel sounds—with these pairs also arranged from front on the left to back on the right, and from maximal closure at top to minimal closure at bottom. No vowel letters are omitted from the chart, though in the past some of the mid central vowels were listed among the 'other symbols'.

Consonants

Pulmonic consonants

A pulmonic consonant is a consonant made by obstructing the glottis (the space between the vocal cords) or oral cavity (the mouth) and either simultaneously or subsequently letting out air from the lungs. Pulmonic consonants make up the majority of consonants in the IPA, as well as in human language. All consonants in English fall into this category.

The pulmonic consonant table, which includes most consonants, is arranged in rows that designate manner of articulation, meaning how the consonant is produced, and columns that designate place of articulation, meaning where in the vocal tract the consonant is produced. The main chart includes only consonants with a single place of articulation.

Notes
 In rows where some letters appear in pairs (the obstruents), the letter to the right represents a voiced consonant (except breathy-voiced ). In the other rows (the sonorants), the single letter represents a voiced consonant.
 While IPA provides a single letter for the coronal places of articulation (for all consonants but fricatives), these do not always have to be used exactly. When dealing with a particular language, the letters may be treated as specifically dental, alveolar, or post-alveolar, as appropriate for that language, without diacritics.
 Shaded areas indicate articulations judged to be impossible.
 The letters  are canonically voiced fricatives but may be used for approximants.
Rather, they are bare phonation.
  are defined as epiglottal fricatives under the "Other symbols" section in the official IPA chart, but they may be treated as trills at the same place of articulation as  because trilling of the aryepiglottic folds typically co-occurs.
 Some listed phones are not known to exist as phonemes in any language.

Non-pulmonic consonants
Non-pulmonic consonants are sounds whose airflow is not dependent on the lungs. These include clicks (found in the Khoisan languages and some neighboring Bantu languages of Africa), implosives (found in languages such as Sindhi, Hausa, Swahili and Vietnamese), and ejectives (found in many Amerindian and Caucasian languages).

Notes
 Clicks have traditionally been described as consisting of a forward place of articulation, commonly called the click 'type' or historically the 'influx', and a rear place of articulation, which when combined with the voicing, aspiration, nasalization, affrication, ejection, timing etc. of the click is commonly called the click 'accompaniment' or historically the 'efflux'. The IPA click letters indicate only the click type (forward articulation and release). Therefore, all clicks require two letters for proper notation:  etc., or with the order reversed if both the forward and rear releases are audible. The letter for the rear articulation is frequently omitted, in which case a  may usually be assumed. However, some researchers dispute the idea that clicks should be analyzed as doubly articulated, as the traditional transcription implies, and analyze the rear occlusion as solely a part of the airstream mechanism. In transcriptions of such approaches, the click letter represents both places of articulation, with the different letters representing the different click types, and diacritics are used for the elements of the accompaniment:  etc.
 Letters for the voiceless implosives  are no longer supported by the IPA, though they remain in Unicode. Instead, the IPA typically uses the voiced equivalent with a voiceless diacritic: , etc..
 The letter for the retroflex implosive, is not "explicitly IPA approved" (Handbook, p. 166), but has the expected form if such a symbol were to be approved.
 The ejective diacritic is placed at the right-hand margin of the consonant, rather than immediately after the letter for the stop: , .

Affricates
Affricates and co-articulated stops are represented by two letters joined by a tie bar, either above or below the letters with no difference in meaning. Affricates are optionally represented by ligatures (e.g. ), though this is no longer official IPA usage because a great number of ligatures would be required to represent all affricates this way.

Co-articulated consonants
Co-articulated consonants are sounds that involve two simultaneous places of articulation (are pronounced using two parts of the vocal tract). In some languages, plosives can be double-articulated, for example in the name of Laurent Gbagbo. 

Notes
 , the Swedish sj-sound, is described by the IPA as a "simultaneous  and ", but it is unlikely such a simultaneous fricative actually exists in any language.
For instance, if a prenasalized stop is transcribed , and a doubly articulated stop , then a prenasalized doubly articulated stop would be 
 If a diacritic needs to be placed on or under a tie bar, the combining grapheme joiner (U+034F) needs to be used, as in  'chewed' (Margi). Font support is spotty, however.

Vowels

The IPA defines a vowel as a sound which occurs at a syllable center. Below is a chart depicting the vowels of the IPA. The IPA maps the vowels according to the position of the tongue.

The vertical axis of the chart is mapped by vowel height. Vowels pronounced with the tongue lowered are at the bottom, and vowels pronounced with the tongue raised are at the top. For example,  (the first vowel in father) is at the bottom because the tongue is lowered in this position.  (the vowel in "meet") is at the top because the sound is said with the tongue raised to the roof of the mouth.

In a similar fashion, the horizontal axis of the chart is determined by vowel backness.

In places where vowels are paired, the right represents a rounded vowel (in which the lips are rounded) while the left is its unrounded counterpart.

Diphthongs
Sometimes a tie bar is used: , especially if it is difficult to tell if the diphthong is characterized by an on-glide, an off-glide or is variable.

Notes

Diacritics and prosodic notation 
Diacritics are used for phonetic detail. They are added to IPA letters to indicate a modification or specification of that letter's normal pronunciation.

By being made superscript, any IPA letter may function as a diacritic, conferring elements of its articulation to the base letter. Superscript diacritics placed after a letter are ambiguous between simultaneous modification of the sound and phonetic detail at the end of the sound. Superscript diacritics placed before a letter, on the other hand, normally indicate a modification of the onset of the sound ( glottalized ,   with a glottal onset). (See .)

Notes
  With aspirated voiced consonants, the aspiration is usually also voiced (voiced aspirated – but see voiced consonants with voiceless aspiration). Some linguists restrict that diacritic to sonorants, such as breathy-voice , and transcribe voiced-aspirated obstruents as e.g. .
  Care must be taken that a superscript retraction sign is not mistaken for mid tone.
  These are relative to the cardinal value of the letter. However, readers might mistake  for "" with a labialized off-glide, or might wonder if the two diacritics cancel each other out. Placing the 'less rounded' diacritic under the labialization diacritic, makes it clear that it is the labialization that is 'less rounded' than its cardinal IPA value.

Subdiacritics (diacritics normally placed below a letter) may be moved above a letter to avoid conflict with a descender, as in voiceless . The raising and lowering diacritics have optional spacing forms ,  that avoid descenders.

The state of the glottis can be finely transcribed with diacritics. A series of alveolar plosives ranging from open-glottis to closed-glottis phonation is:

Additional diacritics are provided by the Extensions to the IPA for speech pathology.

Suprasegmentals
These symbols describe the features of a language above the level of individual consonants and vowels, that is, at the level of syllable, word or phrase. These include prosody, pitch, length, stress, intensity, tone and gemination of the sounds of a language, as well as the rhythm and intonation of speech. Various ligatures of pitch/tone letters and diacritics are provided for by the Kiel Convention and used in the IPA Handbook despite not being found in the summary of the IPA alphabet found on the one-page chart.

Under capital letters below we will see how a carrier letter may be used to indicate suprasegmental features such as labialization or nasalization.

The old staveless tone letters, which are effectively obsolete, include high , mid , low , rising  and falling .

Stress
Officially, the stress marks  appear before the stressed syllable, and thus mark the syllable boundary as well as stress (though the syllable boundary may still be explicitly marked with a period). Occasionally the stress mark is placed immediately before the nucleus of the syllable, after any consonantal onset. In such transcriptions, the stress mark does not mark a syllable boundary. The primary stress mark may be doubled  for extra stress (such as prosodic stress). The secondary stress mark is sometimes seen doubled  for extra-weak stress, but this convention has not been adopted by the IPA. Some dictionaries place both stress marks before a syllable, to indicate that pronunciations with either primary or secondary stress are heard, though this is not IPA usage.

Boundary markers
The tags 'minor' and 'major' are intentionally ambiguous. Depending on need, 'minor' may vary from a foot break to a break in list-intonation to a continuing–prosodic unit boundary (equivalent to a comma), and while 'major' is often any intonation break, it may be restricted to a final–prosodic unit boundary (equivalent to a period). The 'major' symbol may also be doubled, for a stronger break.

For example, C# is a word-final consonant, %V a post-pausa vowel, and T% an IU-final tone (edge tone).

Pitch and tone

 are defined in the Handbook as "upstep" and "downstep", concepts from tonal languages. However, the upstep symbol can also be used for pitch reset, and the IPA Handbook uses it for prosody in the illustration for Portuguese, a non-tonal language.

Phonetic pitch and phonemic tone may be indicated by either diacritics placed over the nucleus of the syllable (e.g., high-pitch ) or by Chao tone letters placed either before or after the word or syllable. There are three graphic variants of the tone letters: with or without a stave, and facing left or facing right from the stave. The stave was introduced with the 1989 Kiel Convention, as was the option of placing a staved letter after the word or syllable, while retaining the older conventions. Of the tone letters, only left-facing staved letters and a few representative combinations are shown in the summary on the Chart, and in practice it is currently more common for tone letters to occur after the syllable/word than before, as in the Chao tradition. Placement before the word is a carry-over from the pre-Kiel IPA convention, as is still the case for the stress and upstep/downstep marks. The IPA endorses the Chao tradition of using the left-facing tone letters, for underlying tone, and the right-facing letters, for surface tone, as occurs in tone sandhi, and for the intonation of non-tonal languages. In the Portuguese illustration in the 1999 Handbook, tone letters are placed before a word or syllable to indicate prosodic pitch (equivalent to  global rise and  global fall, but allowing more precision), and in the Cantonese illustration they are placed after a word/syllable to indicate lexical tone. Theoretically therefore prosodic pitch and lexical tone could be simultaneously transcribed in a single text, though this is not a formalized distinction.

Rising and falling pitch, as in contour tones, are indicated by combining the pitch diacritics and letters in the table, such as grave plus acute for rising  and acute plus grave for falling . Only six combinations of two diacritics are supported, and only across three levels (high, mid, low), despite the diacritics supporting five levels of pitch in isolation. The four other explicitly approved rising and falling diacritic combinations are high/mid rising , low rising , high falling , and low/mid falling .

The Chao tone letters, on the other hand, may be combined in any pattern, and are therefore used for more complex contours and finer distinctions than the diacritics allow, such as mid-rising , extra-high falling , etc. There are 20 such possibilities. However, in Chao's original proposal, which was adopted by the IPA in 1989, he stipulated that the half-high and half-low letters  may be combined with each other, but not with the other three tone letters, so as not to create spuriously precise distinctions. With this restriction, there are 8 possibilities.

The old staveless tone letters tend to be more restricted than the staved letters, though not as restricted as the diacritics. Officially, they support as many distinctions as the staved letters, but typically only three pitch levels are distinguished. Unicode supports default or high-pitch  and low-pitch . Only a few mid-pitch tones are supported (such as ), and then only accidentally.

Although tone diacritics and tone letters are presented as equivalent on the chart, "this was done only to simplify the layout of the chart. The two sets of symbols are not comparable in this way." One can double the diacritics for extra-high  and extra-low ; there is no parallel to this using tone letters. Instead, tone letters have mid-high  and mid-low ; again, there is no equivalent among the diacritics.

The correspondence breaks down even further once they start combining. For more complex tones, one may combine three or four tone diacritics in any permutation, though in practice only generic peaking (rising-falling)  and dipping (falling-rising)  combinations are used. Chao tone letters are required for finer detail (etc.). Although only 10 peaking and dipping tones were proposed in Chao's original, limited set of tone letters, phoneticians often make finer distinctions, and indeed an example is found on the IPA Chart. The system allows the transcription of 112 peaking and dipping pitch contours, including tones that are level for part of their length.

More complex contours are possible.

Chao tone letters generally appear after each syllable, for a language with syllable tone, or after the phonological word, for a language with word tone. The IPA gives the option of placing the tone letters before the word or syllable, but this is rare for lexical tone. (And indeed reversed tone letters may be used to clarify that they apply to the following rather than to the preceding syllable: , .) The staveless letters are not directly supported by Unicode, but some fonts allow the stave in Chao tone letters to be suppressed.

Comparative degree
IPA diacritics may be doubled to indicate an extra degree of the feature indicated. This is a productive process, but apart from extra-high and extra-low tones  being marked by doubled high- and low-tone diacritics, and the major prosodic break  being marked as a double minor break , it is not specifically regulated by the IPA. (Note that transcription marks are similar: double slashes indicate extra (morpho)-phonemic, double square brackets especially precise, and double parentheses especially unintelligible.)

For example, the stress mark may be doubled to indicate an extra degree of stress, such as prosodic stress in English. An example in French, with a single stress mark for normal prosodic stress at the end of each prosodic unit (marked as a minor prosodic break), and a double stress mark for contrastive/emphatic stress:  . Similarly, a doubled secondary stress mark  is commonly used for tertiary (extra-light) stress. In a similar vein, the effectively obsolete (though never retired) staveless tone letters were once doubled for an emphatic rising intonation  and an emphatic falling intonation .

Length is commonly extended by repeating the length mark, as in English shhh! , or for "overlong" segments in Estonian:
 vere  'blood [gen.sg.]', veere  'edge [gen.sg.]', veere  'roll [imp. 2nd sg.]'
 lina  'sheet', linna  'town [gen. sg.]', linna  'town [ine. sg.]'
(Normally additional degrees of length are handled by the extra-short or half-long diacritic, but the first two words in each of the Estonian examples are analyzed as simply short and long, requiring a different remedy for the final words.)

Occasionally other diacritics are doubled:
 Rhoticity in Badaga  "mouth",  "bangle", and  "crop".
 Mild and strong aspirations, .
 Nasalization, as in Palantla Chinantec lightly nasalized  vs heavily nasalized , though in extIPA the latter indicates velopharyngeal frication.
 Weak vs strong ejectives, .
 Especially lowered, e.g.
 The transcription of strident and harsh voice as extra-creaky  may be motivated by the similarities of these phonations.

Ambiguous letters
A number of IPA letters are not consistently used for their official values. A distinction between voiced fricatives and approximants is only partially implemented by the IPA, for example. Even with the relatively recent addition of the palatal fricative  and the velar approximant  to the alphabet, other letters, though defined as fricatives, are often ambiguous between fricative and approximant. For forward places,  and  can generally be assumed to be fricatives unless they carry a lowering diacritic.

To some extent this may be an effect of analysis, but it is common to match up single IPA letters to the phonemes of a language, without overly worrying about phonetic precision.

This has the advantage of merging the upper-pharyngeal fricatives  together with the epiglottal plosive  and trills  into a single pharyngeal column in the consonant chart. However, in Shilha Berber the epiglottal fricatives are not trilled.

Among vowels,  is officially a front vowel, but is more commonly treated as a central vowel. The difference, to the extent it is even possible, is not phonemic in any language.

For all phonetic notation, it is good practice for an author to specify exactly what they mean by the symbols that they use.

Redundant letters
Three letters are not needed and would be hard to justify today by the standards of the modern IPA, but are retained due to inertia.  appears because it is found in English; officially it is a fricative, with terminology dating to the days before 'fricative' and 'approximant' were distinguished. Indeed, outside of English transcription, that is what is more commonly found in the literature.  is another historic remnant. There have been several votes to retire  from the IPA, but so far they have failed. Finally,  is officially a simultaneous postalveolar and velar fricative, a realization that does not appear to exist in any language. It is retained because it is convenient for the transcription of Swedish, where it is used for a consonant that has various realizations in different dialects. That is, it is not actually a phonetic character at all, but a phonemic one, which is officially beyond the purview of the IPA alphabet; indeed, another phonemic IPA letter,  for the homorganic nasal of Japanese, was retired because it had no defined phonetic value.

Superscript letters

Superscript IPA letters may be used to indicate secondary articulation; onsets, releases and other transitions; shades of sound; light epenthetic sounds and incompletely articulated sounds. In 2020, the IPA and ICPLA endorsed the Unicode encoding of superscript variants of all contemporary IPA letters apart from the Chao tone letters, including the extended retroflex letters , which were thus confirmed as being implicit in the IPA alphabet.

Superscript letters can be meaningfully modified by combining diacritics, just as baseline letters can. Although the diacritic may seem a bit oversized compared to the superscript letter it modifies, e.g. , this can be an aid to legibility, just as it is with the composite superscript c-cedilla  and rhotic vowels . Superscript length marks can be used to indicate the length of aspiration of a consonant, e.g. . Another option is to double the diacritic: .

Obsolete and nonstandard symbols

A number of IPA letters and diacritics have been retired or replaced over the years. This number includes duplicate symbols, symbols that were replaced due to user preference, and unitary symbols that were rendered with diacritics or digraphs to reduce the inventory of the IPA. The rejected symbols are now considered obsolete, though some are still seen in the literature.

The IPA once had several pairs of duplicate symbols from alternative proposals, but eventually settled on one or the other. These have been officially retired but are still used. In addition, the rare voiceless implosives, were dropped soon after their introduction and are now usually written . The original set of click letters, was retired but is still sometimes seen, as the current pipe letters  can cause problems with legibility, especially when used with brackets ([ ] or / /), the letter , or the prosodic marks . (For this reason, some publications which use the current IPA pipe letters disallow IPA brackets.)

Individual non-IPA letters may find their way into publications that otherwise use the standard IPA. This is especially common with:
 The Karlgren letters for Chinese vowels,  
 Digits for tonal phonemes that have conventional numbers in a local tradition, such as the four tones of Standard Chinese. This may be more convenient for comparison between related languages and dialects than a phonetic transcription would be, because tones vary more unpredictably than segmental phonemes do.
 Digits for tone levels, which are simpler to typeset, though the lack of standardization can cause confusion (e.g.  is high tone in some languages but low tone in others;  may be high, medium or low tone, depending on the local convention).
These are referred to in the Handbook and have been included in IPA requests for Unicode support.

In addition, it is common to see ad hoc typewriter substitutions, generally capital letters, for when IPA support is not available, e.g. (See also SAMPA and X-SAMPA substitute notation.)

Extensions

The Extensions to the International Phonetic Alphabet for Disordered Speech, commonly abbreviated "extIPA" and sometimes called "Extended IPA", are symbols whose original purpose was to accurately transcribe disordered speech. At the Kiel Convention in 1989, a group of linguists drew up the initial extensions, which were based on the previous work of the PRDS (Phonetic Representation of Disordered Speech) Group in the early 1980s. The extensions were first published in 1990, then modified, and published again in 1994 in the Journal of the International Phonetic Association, when they were officially adopted by the ICPLA. While the original purpose was to transcribe disordered speech, linguists have used the extensions to designate a number of sounds within standard communication, such as hushing, gnashing teeth, and smacking lips, as well as regular lexical sounds such as lateral fricatives that do not have standard IPA symbols.

In addition to the Extensions to the IPA for disordered speech, there are the conventions of the Voice Quality Symbols, which include a number of symbols for additional airstream mechanisms and secondary articulations in what they call "voice quality".

Associated notation
Capital letters and various characters on the number row of the keyboard are commonly used to extend the alphabet in various ways.

Associated symbols
There are various punctuation-like conventions for linguistic transcription that are commonly used together with IPA. Some of the more common are:

(a) A reconstructed form.
(b) An ungrammatical form (including an unphonemic form).

(a) A reconstructed form, deeper (more ancient) than a single , used when reconstructing even further back from already-starred forms.
(b) An ungrammatical form.

 An ungrammatical form.

 A doubtfully grammatical form.

 A generalized form, such as a typical shape of a wanderwort that has not actually been reconstructed.

 A word boundary – e.g.  for a word-initial vowel.

 A phonological word boundary; e.g.  for a high tone that occurs in such a position.

 The location of a segment – e.g.  for an intervocalic position

Capital letters 
Full capital letters are not used as IPA symbols, except as typewriter substitutes (e.g. They are, however, often used in conjunction with the IPA in two cases:
 for (archi)phonemes and for natural classes of sounds (that is, as wildcards). The extIPA chart, for example, uses capital letters as wildcards in its illustrations. 
 as carrying letters for the Voice Quality Symbols.

Wildcards are commonly used in phonology to summarize syllable or word shapes, or to show the evolution of classes of sounds. In speech pathology, capital letters represent indeterminate sounds, and may be superscripted to indicate they are weakly articulated: e.g.  is a weak indeterminate alveolar,  a weak indeterminate velar.

Similar usage is found for phonemic analysis, where a language does not distinguish sounds that have separate letters in the IPA.

,  and  have completely different meanings as Voice Quality Symbols, where they stand for "voice" (generally meaning secondary articulation, as in  "nasal voice", not phonetic voicing), "falsetto" and "creak". They may also take diacritics that indicate what kind of voice quality an utterance has, and may be used to extract a suprasegmental feature that occurs on all susceptible segments in a stretch of IPA. The usual wildcard X or C might be used instead of V so that the reader does not misinterpret  as meaning that only vowels are labialized (i.e.  for all segments labialized,  for all consonants labialized), or the carrier letter may be omitted altogether (e.g. ,  or ). (See  for other transcription conventions.)

Segments without letters
The blank cells on the IPA chart can be filled without much difficulty if the need arises. The expected retroflex letter forms have appeared in the literature for the retroflex implosive , the retroflex lateral flap  and the retroflex clicks ; the first is mentioned in the IPA Handbook and the IPA requested Unicode support for superscript variants of all three. The missing voiceless lateral fricatives are provided for by the extIPA. The epiglottal trill is arguably covered by the generally trilled epiglottal "fricatives" . Labiodental plosives  appear in some old Bantuist texts. Ad hoc near-close central vowels  are used in some descriptions of English. Diacritics are able to fill in most of the remainder of the charts. If a sound cannot be transcribed, an asterisk  may be used, either as a letter or as a diacritic (as in  sometimes seen for the Korean "fortis" velar).

Consonants
Representations of consonant sounds outside of the core set are created by adding diacritics to letters with similar sound values. The Spanish bilabial and dental approximants are commonly written as lowered fricatives,  and  respectively. Similarly, voiced lateral fricatives would be written as raised lateral approximants, ; extIPA provides  for the first of these. A few languages such as Banda have a bilabial flap as the preferred allophone of what is elsewhere a labiodental flap. It has been suggested that this be written with the labiodental flap letter and the advanced diacritic, .
Similarly, a labiodental trill would be written  (bilabial trill and the dental sign), and labiodental stops  rather than with the ad hoc letters sometimes found in the literature. Other taps can be written as extra-short plosives or laterals, e.g. , though in some cases the diacritic would need to be written below the letter. A retroflex trill can be written as a retracted , just as non-subapical retroflex fricatives sometimes are. The remaining consonants – the uvular laterals ( etc.) and the palatal trill – while not strictly impossible, are very difficult to pronounce and are unlikely to occur even as allophones in the world's languages.

Vowels
The vowels are similarly manageable by using diacritics for raising, lowering, fronting, backing, centering, and mid-centering. The only known vowels that cannot be represented in this scheme are vowels with unexpected roundedness, which would require a dedicated diacritic, such as protruded  and compressed  (or protruded  and compressed ).

Symbol names

An IPA symbol is often distinguished from the sound it is intended to represent, since there is not necessarily a one-to-one correspondence between letter and sound in broad transcription, making articulatory descriptions such as "mid front rounded vowel" or "voiced velar stop" unreliable. While the Handbook of the International Phonetic Association states that no official names exist for its symbols, it admits the presence of one or two common names for each. The symbols also have nonce names in the Unicode standard. In many cases, the names in Unicode and the IPA Handbook differ. For example, the Handbook calls  "epsilon", while Unicode calls it "small letter open e".

The traditional names of the Latin and Greek letters are usually used for unmodified letters. In Unicode, some of the letters of Greek origin have Latin forms for use in IPA; the others use the characters from the Greek block.

For diacritics, there are two methods of naming. For traditional diacritics, the IPA notes the name in a well known language; for example,  is "e-acute", based on the name of the diacritic in English and French. Non-traditional diacritics are often named after objects they resemble, so  is called "d-bridge".

Geoffrey Pullum and William Ladusaw list a variety of names in use for both current and retired IPA symbols in their Phonetic Symbol Guide. Many of them found their way into Unicode.

Computer support

Unicode

Unicode supports nearly all of the IPA alphabet. Apart from basic Latin and Greek and general punctuation, the primary blocks are IPA Extensions, Spacing Modifier Letters and Combining Diacritical Marks, with lesser support from Phonetic Extensions, Phonetic Extensions Supplement, Combining Diacritical Marks Supplement, and scattered characters elsewhere. The extended IPA is supported primarily by those blocks and Latin Extended-G.

IPA numbers 

After the Kiel Convention in 1989, most IPA symbols were assigned an identifying number to prevent confusion between similar characters during the printing of manuscripts. The codes were never much used and have been superseded by Unicode.

Typefaces

Many typefaces have support for IPA characters, but good diacritic rendering remains rare. Web browsers generally do not need any configuration to display IPA characters, provided that a typeface capable of doing so is available to the operating system.

System fonts
The ubiquitous Arial and Times New Roman fonts include IPA characters, but they are neither complete (especially Arial) nor render diacritics properly. The basic Latin Noto fonts are better, only failing with the more obscure characters. The proprietary Calibri font, which is the default font of Microsoft Office, has nearly complete IPA support with good diacritic rendering.

Other commercial fonts
Brill has good IPA support. It is a commercial font but freely available for non-commercial use.

Free fonts
Typefaces that provide nearly full IPA support and properly render diacritics include Gentium Plus, Charis SIL, Doulos SIL, and Andika.
In addition to the support found in other fonts, these fonts support the full range of old-style (pre-Kiel) staveless tone letters, through a character variant option that suppresses the stave of the Chao tone letters. They also have an option to maintain the  ~  distinction in italic. However, the combining parentheses, and especially the combining paired parentheses, which are used in extIPA to bracket diacritics, often don't display properly.

ASCII and keyboard transliterations

Several systems have been developed that map the IPA symbols to ASCII characters. Notable systems include SAMPA and X-SAMPA. The usage of mapping systems in on-line text has to some extent been adopted in the context input methods, allowing convenient keying of IPA characters that would be otherwise unavailable on standard keyboard layouts.

IETF language tags
IETF language tags have registered  as a variant subtag identifying text as written in IPA.
For the use of IPA without attribution to a concrete language,  is available.

Computer input using on-screen keyboard
Online IPA keyboard utilities are available, though none of them cover the complete range of IPA symbols and diacritics. In April 2019, Google's Gboard for Android added an IPA keyboard to its platform. For iOS there are multiple free keyboard layouts available, e.g. "IPA Phonetic Keyboard".

See also

 
 
 
 
 
 
 
 Index of phonetics articles
 
 
 List of international common standards
 
 
 
  
  – inventor of IPA-based Yakut scripts
  provides IPA support for LaTeX

Notes

References

Further reading

 
 
 
 
  (hb);  (pb).
 
 
 
  (hb);  (pb).

External links

 
 Interactive IPA chart

 
Phonetic guides
Unicode